Earlandite, [Ca3(C6H5O7)2(H2O)2]·2H2O, is the mineral form of calcium citrate tetrahydrate. It was first reported in 1936 and named after the English microscopist and oceanographer Arthur Earland FRSE. Earlandite occurs as warty fine-grained nodules ca. 1 mm in size in bottom sediments of the Weddell Sea, off Antarctica. Its crystal symmetry was first assigned as orthorhombic, then as monoclinic, and finally as triclinic.

References

Bibliography
Palache, P.; Berman H.; Frondel, C. (1960). "Dana's System of Mineralogy, Volume II: Halides, Nitrates, Borates, Carbonates, Sulfates, Phosphates, Arsenates, Tungstates, Molybdates, Etc. (Seventh Edition)" John Wiley and Sons, Inc., New York, pp. 1105-1106.

Calcium minerals
Organic minerals
Triclinic minerals
Minerals in space group 2
Minerals described in 1936